Ralph-William Johnson Priso-Mbongue (born August 2, 2002) is a Canadian soccer player who plays as a midfielder for Major League Soccer club Colorado Rapids.

Early career
He began playing soccer at the age of four with Clairlea-Westview SC, before moving to the North Toronto Nitros when he was eleven. In 2016, he was invited to Adidas's Elite Soccer Program. He tried out for the Toronto FC Academy at ages 11, 12, and 13, failing to make the program, before finally being accepted in 2017, at age 14.

Club career

Early career 
In 2018, he played with Toronto FC III in the semi-professional League1 Ontario, making six appearances. He scored his first goal against Darby FC on July 17, 2018. On March 5, 2019, he signed his first professional contract, joining Toronto FC II in USL League One. His debut professional appearance came when he started against the Richmond Kickers on August 17, 2019.

Toronto FC 
On October 14, 2020, he signed with first team Toronto FC, becoming the 25th player to sign as a Homegrown Player from the TFC Academy. He made his debut on October 24, coming on as a substitute for Nick DeLeon against the Philadelphia Union. He was loaned to the second team for some matches in 2021. On July 21, 2021, he scored his first goal for Toronto FC in a 1-1 draw against the New York Red Bulls. On August 19, Toronto FC announced Priso would undergo season-ending ankle surgery after suffering an injury on August 14 against the New England Revolution.

Colorado Rapids 

In July 2022, Priso was traded from Toronto FC to fellow MLS club Colorado Rapids for Mark-Anthony Kaye. Colorado would also receive $1.025 million in General Allocation Money, and an international roster slot in the trade. He made his debut on July 17, against the LA Galaxy.

International career
In 2016, at age 13, he made his debut in the Canadian youth program at an identification camp with coach Ante Jazic. He represented Canada at the 2017 CONCACAF Boys' Under-15 Championship, serving as team captain. He played for the Canadian U17 team at the 2019 CONCACAF U-17 Championship and the 2019 FIFA U-17 World Cup. He was called to the Canada national team camp for January 2021.

Personal life
Priso is of Cameroonian descent through his parents. He is the older brother of Toronto FC II player Hugo Mbongue.

Career statistics

Club

Honours
Toronto FC
Canadian Championship: 2020

References

External links
 
 

2002 births
Living people
Canadian soccer players
Canada men's youth international soccer players
Association football midfielders
Soccer players from Toronto
Toronto FC players
Toronto FC II players
USL League One players
Black Canadian soccer players
Canadian people of Cameroonian descent
Homegrown Players (MLS)
Major League Soccer players
North Toronto Nitros players
MLS Next Pro players
Colorado Rapids players
Colorado Rapids 2 players